Nikos Karvelas (born Nikos Leonardos, 8 September 1951) is a Greek songwriter, producer and singer. He has sold millions of records as a producer and is most recognizable for his three-decade-long collaboration with Anna Vissi, while some of his other well-known collaborations include Tolis Voskopoulos and Sakis Rouvas. Karvelas has released multiple personal studio albums that have had mild to big success. In 2012, Alpha TV ranked Karvelas as the 13th top-certified composer in Greece in the phonographic era.

Early life
Karvelas was born in Piraeus. When he was five years old, his parents bought him his first piano. He started to play popular songs and composed his first melodies. During the 1970s, he studied law at the University of Athens. Karvelas created his first rock band influenced by famous rock bands like the Beatles and The Rolling Stones. He started to become known at the end of the 1970s. In the early 1980s, Karvelas met his muse, Vissi, and a few years later, in 1983, they got married. Vissi has claimed that the first impression she had when she met Karvelas was a "hairy thing," but she was amazed by his talent and his sex appeal.

Career

1985–1991
Karvelas' career as a singer started in 1985 when he released his first studio album under CBS Records Greece, San Diskos Palios (Like An Old Record) making two big hits, Despina and Kalokairines Diakopes (Summer Holidays). The album sold over 50,000 copies and became gold. In 1987, he released his second album Ola i Tipota (All or Nothing) and it became platinum. Next year, he released his third album, Dimosies Scheseis (Public Relations) and in 1989 he released his fourth album, "Tsouzi." His fifth step came out in 1990 and tended to be his "lucky" album. It was called Diavolaki (Little Devil) and became gold. The top hit of the album was Antistrofi Metrisi (Countdown), a duet with Vissi.

One year later, he released another gold album, titled O Teleftaios Horos (The Last Dance). The self-titled duet with Vissi confirmed the rumors about the problems of their marriage. In 1991, Karvelas and Vissi tried their luck in a different type of music. Demones (Demons) is the first opera composed by Karvelas and Vissi was the protagonist, while actors including Giannis Samsiaris and John Modinos participated. Vissi has stated "Me and Nikos would like so much to do Demones in Athens and we spent all our money to produce it without knowing if it will have success". The rock opera was a great success and for two years the theater "Attikon" was sold-out.

1992–1999
 
Emeis (We) was the next album of Karvelas, released in 1992 with the top single Emeis, another duet with Vissi. Two years later, Karvelas releases another gold album, 25 ores (25 Hours). All the albums were great successes and became either gold or platinum. In 1993, Karvelas released Best Of with 2 new songs, "Oikto" (Mercy) and "Thes Den Thes" (Whether You Want or Not). In 1996, he released the album To Aroma tis Amartias (The Aroma of Sin) and it became platinum. Next year, the title of his gold album, O Pio Eftihismenos Anthropos Pano Sti Gi (The Happiest Man On Earth), ironically expressed Karvelas' mood. This certain period, Karvelas moved to London permanently, having enough time and great inspiration to prepare his next steps. He released the album Ena Hrono to Perissotero (One Year the Most). Vissi sang with Nikos the top single of the album which was the name of the album.

2000–present
In 2000, Karvelas from London shared his new hits with his fans in the album Ola Ine Endaxi (Everything Is Alright). However, he started to prepare his new musical Mala, dealing with the story of Mala Zimetbaum, a Jewish girl who tried to escape from Auschwitz in 1944.

In January 2002, Mala’s premiere in "Pallas" theater took place, with Vissi playing the lead role. The musical was a great success and it was sold-out every night. After Mala, Karvelas released an album titled, Party Gia Spasmenes Kardies (Party for Broken Hearts). Boom Boom Boom was the first single of the album, a memorial duet with Vissi. His next album was Robot, released by Nitro Music. In 2004, he released a single dedicated to the Greek football champion team in Euro 2004.

The title was Imaste Nikites (We Are Winners). Some of the football players participated in the song's music video. In 2006, he released the album Thriller and in 2007 the single Pios Fovate ton Passari (Who's Afraid of Passaris). In late 2007, he released the album Trakter. In February 2009, Karvelas released his 19th studio album titled Adio Heimona. In a radio interview prior to the album's release, good friend Natalia Germanou, described the album as featuring a variety of styles, and classified it as "the return of good old Karvelas." In December 2009, it was announced that Karvelas would become the head judge on the Greek talent show "Greek Idol" to be aired on Alpha TV in 2010, but he eventually withdrew from the project before it started airing.

Personal life
Karvelas first met Vissi in early 1980s, and married in 1983. They have a daughter named Sofia Karvela. The couple later divorced, but have remained good friends to date, while Karvelas also has written the lyrics of most of Vissi's songs.

In January 2008, Karvelas had a son named Andreas with his fiancé Annita Pania. In November 2008, Pania and Karvelas were arrested by the police after an alleged police chase, which started off with them crossing a red traffic light. Police then allegedly chased them and used their sirens on to pull them over. Karvelas allegedly continued on, crossing more red lights and driving erratically, while the police continued chasing him. Pania and Karvelas claimed that they were listening to a new song of Karvelas wrote, with the volume up high, and did not hear any sirens and didn't notice the police car. They also denied even crossing the red light. Later, the couple claimed that the policemen not only were overzealous, commanding and rude (using the word re), but also threatened them with their weapons. Pania also mentioned later on TV that she does respect the police, but on the other hand the couple would not comply to "bullies", "cops" and "batsi" (the latter is a pejorative Greek word signifying policemen), whose insulting behavior rather "reminded of the Greek Junta". The couple vowed to take the subject up in court. Pania and Karvelas were later judged in court, found guilty and sentenced to 14 and 10 months in prison respectively, though they were allowed to buy out their sentences.

In January 2008, his son, Andreas, was born. In 2010, Karvelas married Annita Pania in Athens and in 2016 they divorced.

Discography

Studio albums

CD singles

Compilations

As a songwriter for other artists

 1981: Anna Vissi – Anna Vissi (as Nikos Leonardos) – Platinum
 1982: Anna Vissi – Eimai To Simera Kai Eisai To Hthes
 1984: Anna Vissi – Na 'Hes Kardia – Gold
 1985: Anna Vissi – Kati Simveni – Gold
 1986: Anna Vissi – I Epomeni Kinisi – Platinum
 1986: Rita Sakellariou – Areso – Platinum
 1988: Anna Vissi – Tora – Gold
 1988: Anna Vissi – Empnefsi! – Gold
 1989: Anna Vissi – Fotia – Platinum
 1990: Anna Vissi – Eimai – Gold
 1992: Katerina Stanisi – Anastatonomai – Gold
 1992: Anna Vissi – Lambo
 1993: Katerina Stanisi – Na Mineis – Gold
 1993: Lefteris Pantazis – Ego Den Eimai Ego – Platinum
 1993: Anna Vissi – Live!
 1994: Sakis Rouvas – Aima, Dakrya & Idrotas – Platinum
 1994: Lefteris Pantazis – O Paixtis – Gold
 1994: Anna Vissi – Re! – Gold
 1995: Lefteris Pantazis – Erhetai – Gold
 1996: Sakis Rouvas – Tora Arhizoun Ta Dyskola – Platinum
 1996: Lambis Livieratos – Bam Kai Kato – Gold
 1996: Anna Vissi – Klima Tropiko – 3× Platinum
 1997: Lambis Livieratos – Poios Einai Aftos – Gold
 1997: Anna Vissi – Travma – 3× Platinum
 1998: Anna Vissi – Antidoto – 3× Platinum
 1999: Christina Anagnostopoulou – Ola Ki Ola
 1999: Dimitris Kokotas – Gia Mena – Gold
 2000: Anna Vissi – Everything I Am – Platinum
 2000: Anna Vissi – Kravgi – 7× Platinum
 2001: Christina Anagnostopoulou – Ke Hamogelao
 2002: Anna Vissi – X – 2× Platinum
 2003: Anna Vissi – Paraksenes Eikones – 2× Platinum
 2004: Christina Anagnostopoulou – Straight
 2004: Anna Vissi – Live – Platinum
 2005: Anna Vissi – Nylon – Platinum
 2007: Various artists – Je T'Aime
 2010: Anna Vissi – Agapi Einai Esi – Gold
 2011: Paschalis Terzis – Dio Nichtes Mono
 2013: Vigor – Još Fališ (single)
 2015: Anna Vissi – Sinentefksi

See also
Mala: I Mousiki Tou Anemou

References 

1951 births
Living people
Musicians from Piraeus
Anna Vissi
Arion Music Awards winners
Greek songwriters
20th-century Greek male singers
Greek music managers
Greek laïko singers
Greek pop singers
MAD Video Music Awards winners